Jeff Speakman (born November 8, 1958) is an American actor and a martial artist in the art of American Kenpo and Japanese Gōjū-ryū, earning black belts in each. Between 2008 and 2018, he was President of the International Kempo Federation.

Early life
Speakman was born and raised in the suburbs of Chicago, Illinois, where he was a springboard diver at John Hersey High School and achieved All-American status. He graduated from Missouri Southern State College.

He has said that the television show Kung Fu got him interested in martial arts, and he began by studying the Okinawan martial art of Gōjū-ryū until achieving black belt rank. His instructor then recommended that if he was really intent in pursuing martial arts as a lifestyle, then he should go looking for Ed Parker, a friend of his master. Speakman sold his car to pay for the moving expenses and met Parker at one of the latter's tournaments. Speakman spent years training in American Kenpo under his principal instructor, Larry Tatum, as well as under the system's founder Parker.

Speakman received his first-degree black belt in American Kenpo in 1984. He was promoted to ninth degree in kenpo karate by Mills Crenshaw and Bob White and ninth in Gōjū-ryū by Lou Angel on July 2, 2013. He was promoted to tenth degree on July 9, 2022. He had started Gōjū-ryū in 1978.

Career
Speakman started acting in 1988 and had his first main role in 1991 with the release of The Perfect Weapon, He followed this up with the feature film Street Knight. In the United Kingdom, this movie was released straight to video in 1993. Other action films followed, including The Expert and Deadly Outbreak.

Speakman holds training camps every year at the Jeff Speakman International Kenpo Camp for American kenpo. In 1993, Speakman was inducted into the Black Belt Hall of Fame for Instructor of the Year. He was also recognized for excellence in martial arts and was inducted into the Masters Hall of Fame in 2009 where he received the Silver Life Achievement Award.

Speakman is also founder and director of American Kenpo Karate Systems (AKKS), an international kenpo karate organization with more than 50 schools.

In 2013, Speakman was ill with throat cancer, however he has since fully recovered from it. He has continued his martial arts labor, transforming his previous association, AKKS into Kenpo 5.0. Citing some of Ed Parker's last statements about American Kenpo, Speakman decided to make an attempt to integrate ground fighting techniques into Kenpo's self-defense curriculum. Speakman is adamant that in doing this he is preserving the will of Parker, who always intended Kenpo to continue evolving, and that his additions to the system will increase the student's ability to repel any type of attack.

Filmography

Film and television credits

References

External links

 

1958 births
American male film actors
Living people
Missouri Southern State University alumni
Male actors from Chicago
American male karateka
American Kenpo practitioners
Gōjū-ryū practitioners
John Hersey High School alumni